Alexandra Hulley (born 24 July 1997) is an Australian athlete. She competed in the women's hammer throw at the 2018 Commonwealth Games, winning the silver medal.

References

External links
 
 Alex Hulley at Athletics Australia

1997 births
Living people
Australian female hammer throwers
Place of birth missing (living people)
Athletes (track and field) at the 2018 Commonwealth Games
Commonwealth Games silver medallists for Australia
Commonwealth Games medallists in athletics
Athletes (track and field) at the 2014 Summer Youth Olympics
Australian Athletics Championships winners
21st-century Australian women
Medallists at the 2018 Commonwealth Games